John Blake Jr. (December 5, 1762 – January 13, 1826) was an American slave owner, lawyer, and politician and a U. S. Representative from New York.

Biography
Born in Ulster County in the Province of New York, Blake attended the public schools and during the Revolutionary War Blake served in the New York State Militia. He married Elsie Eager and they had six children, Margaret, Ann, William, Sarah, Fanny, and Elsie.

Career
Appointed deputy sheriff of Ulster County in 1793, Blake was then a member of the New York State Assembly in 22nd New York State Legislature from 1798 to 1799 and 23rd New York State Legislature in 1800. He was sheriff of Orange County from 1803 to 1805.

Elected as a Democratic-Republican to the 9th and 10th United States Congresses, Blake was United States Representative for the fifth district of New York from March 4, 1805, to March 4, 1809.

Blake was again a member of the State assembly in 36th New York State Legislature from 1812 to 1813. He served as judge of the Orange County Court of Common Pleas from 1815 to 1818. He was a presidential elector in 1816, voting for James Monroe and Daniel D. Tompkins.

Again serving in the State assembly in 1819, Blake was then supervisor of the town of Montgomery for fifteen terms.

Death
Blake died in Montgomery, Orange County, New York. He is interred at Berea Churchyard, near Newburgh, New York.

References

External links

1762 births
1826 deaths
People from Ulster County, New York
Sheriffs of Ulster County, New York
Members of the New York State Assembly
American deputy sheriffs
1816 United States presidential electors
Democratic-Republican Party members of the United States House of Representatives from New York (state)
New York (state) sheriffs